This page presents the results of the Men's 9-man Volleyball Tournament at the 1958 Asian Games, which was held from 25 May to 31 May 1958 in Tokyo, Japan.

Results

Final standing

References
 Results

External links
OCA official website

Men's Volleyball